Guilty Minds is an Indian Hindi-language legal drama streaming television series on Amazon Prime Video. The series is written and directed by Shefali Bhushan and Jayant Digambar Somalkar. This series stars Shriya Pilgaonkar, Varun Mitra, Sugandha Garg, Kulbhushan Kharbanda and Satish Kaushik in the lead.

Plot
The story revolves around Kashaf Quaze, Deepak Rana and Vandana Kathpalia, three law school friends who are often put opposite each other in the court of law. Kashaf and Vandana run a law centre where they take up class action and humanitarian cases while Deepak represents Khanna & Khanna a popular law firm with rich clients. Each episode in the series dwells with issues such as rape, artificial intelligence, water shortage and how those issues interact with the lives and principles of the characters.

Cast
Shriya Pilgaonkar as Kashaf Quaze
Varun Mitra as Deepak Rana
Sugandha Garg as Vandana Kathpalia
Namrata Sheth as Shubhangi Khanna
Satish Kaushik as Tajinder Bhalla
Kulbhushan Kharbanda as L N Khanna
Benjamin Gilani as Munawwar Quaze
Pranay Pachauri as Shubhrat Khanna
Diksha Juneja as Riya Singh
Sadhana Singh as Mumtaz
Deepak Kalra as Kitu Bhalla
Chitrangada Satarupa as Sunanda Bose
Virendra Saxena as Vishwambar Chauhan
Karishma Tanna as Mala Kumari
Suchitra Krishnamurthy as Neela Raghunandan
Dinker Sharma as Hasan
Akshay Baghel as Abhijeet
Vasundhara Kaul as Antara
Arun Kalra as Shamsher Khanna
Meet Vora as Prateek Malhotra
Hans Dev Sharma as Dilrah Khanaa 
Atul Kumar as Diveyendu Khurana
Suhita Thatte as Justice Shukla
Shakti Kapoor as Anwar (Episode-5 Aalaap)

Reception
Guilty Minds received positive to mixed reviews.

Shubhra Gupta from The Indian Express writes, "This is a well-done, well-acted show. My only quibble is the banal title ‘Guilty Minds’, which feels un-nuanced for a show which says everyone is innocent until they are proved guilty, and maybe not even then. Just by virtue of the fact that one of the lead characters is Muslim, whose unresolved childhood trauma can belong to anyone– religion, caste, creed no bar– makes it a big win, given our times."

Abhimanyu Mathur from Hindustan Times writes that "It is refreshing to see the courtrooms of India depicted as how they are, and hats off to showrunner Shefali Bhushan for that."

References

External links
 
 Guilty Minds at Amazon Prime Video

Hindi-language television shows
Legal drama television series
2022 Indian television series debuts